Jordi Hoogstrate (born 2 June 1983) is a retired Dutch footballer who played as a midfielder.

Career
Hoogstrate started his career in 2001 with FC Groningen and was named a talented midfielder. He followed his former teammate Arjen Robben on a €3 million transfer to PSV Eindhoven summer 2003. At PSV Hoogstrate suffered with serious knee injuries. He only played five matches for PSV. He was on loan at FC Emmen for two periods but suffered again with knee injuries. In 2008, when his contract in Eindhoven was expired, he rejoined FC Groningen and would start in the reserve squad. In July, in a match with Jong FC Groningen, he got seriously injured on his knee once again. He ended his career in March 2009 and started to coach in the FC Groningen youth academy. Hoogstrate also played for the Netherlands national under-21 football team.

Honours
 Eredivisie: 2005, 2008
 KNVB Cup: 2005
 Johan Cruijff Shield: 2003

References

1983 births
Living people
Footballers from Groningen (city)
Association football midfielders
Dutch footballers
PSV Eindhoven players
FC Groningen players
FC Emmen players
Eredivisie players
Eerste Divisie players